Marios Nicolaou may refer to:
Marios Nicolaou (footballer born 1981), Cypriot defender for Olympiakos Nicosia, Nea Salamis Famagusta and AC Omonia
Marios Nicolaou (footballer born 1983), Cypriot midfielder for Panionios of Greece, Aris Limassol and AC Omonia
Marios Nicolaou (footballer, born 1996), Cypriot footballer